Strange Messenger is the art exhibition by Patti Smith, published in 2003 as a book.

Notes

External links 
 Strange Messenger at The Andy Warhol Museum in Pittsburgh
 

Art exhibitions in the United States
Books by Patti Smith
2003 books